Paldiski railway station is a railway station serving the town and Baltic Sea port of Paldiski, situated on the Pakri Peninsula of northwestern Estonia.

The station is the western terminus of the Tallinn-Paldiski railway. The station opened in 1870 when a railway line was opened connecting Saint Petersburg with Paldiski, via Gatchina, Narva, Tapa and Tallinn. Currently, the station is served by Tallinn's commuter rail network, an electrified commuter rail network operated by Elron, linking the city of Tallinn with its suburbs and the surrounding countryside.

See also
 List of railway stations in Estonia
 Rail transport in Estonia
 History of rail transport in Estonia

References

Citations

External links

 Official website of Eesti Raudtee (EVR) – the national railway infrastructure company of Estonia  responsible for maintenance and traffic control of most of the Estonian railway network
 Official website of Elron – the national passenger train operating company of Estonia responsible for all domestic passenger train services in Estonia

Railway stations in Estonia
Railway stations opened in 1870
1870s establishments in Estonia
Buildings and structures in Harju County